Sadwaqas (Saken, Sadvakas) Ghylmani (Gilmanov, Gelmanov) (Sádýaqas Ǵylmanı; 1890 – April 24, 1972) was a long-serving qadi of Kazakhstan (Kazakh SSR), imam-khatib and member of the Muslim Council for Central Asia and Kazakhstan.

Sadwaqas Ghylmani was born in 1890 in Maltabar village (aul) (Akmolinsk Oblast of Russian Empire) in Bashkir-origin family. His grandfather Salmen Muhamediyarovich Gazin (1856—1939) and great-grandfather Muhamediyar Mukhtarovich Gazin (1807—1870) were mullahs. From 1929 to 1946 he was persecuted by the Soviet atheistic authorities. In 1946 he became a mullah (imam) in a mosque in Akmolinsk (modern Nur-Sultan, capital of Kazakhstan). In 1952, qadi of Kazakhstani Qadiyat Abd al-Ghaffar Shamsutdinov appointed him as his successor. Sadwaqas Ghylmani held this position until his death on April 24, 1972. He is buried at the Kensai cemetery in Almaty.

References

Bibliography 
 
 

1890 births
Year of birth uncertain
1972 deaths
20th-century Kazakhstani writers
Soviet imams